A Tribute to Pet Sounds is a tribute album compiled by the Reverberation Appreciation Society and released on May 27, 2016. Its subject is the Beach Boys' 1966 album Pet Sounds, consisting of various artists' cover versions of the album's tracks. The tribute was created to celebrate Brian Wilson's 50th anniversary performance of Pet Sounds at the Levitation festival in Austin, Texas.

The album was scheduled to be released exclusively as a double-vinyl LP at the festival before it was cancelled.

Reception

Stereogums Michelle Laggan wrote that the album "strikes a unique balance in the degree to which it strays from the original ... the tribute mostly contains subtle modifications that find a happy middle ground between innovation and mimicry. With this, the album serves its ostensible purpose"

Popmatters Jasper Bruce highlighted "That's Not Me" and "Here Today" as standout tracks, "effectively juggling vocal harmony, experimentation and positive energy to pull off ingenious takes of two of the Beach Boys’ classics.  ... It’s a shame that these tracks have to be rated alongside some of the others. ... Predictably, many of the performers become too caught up in speaking to the experimental character of the Beach Boys and end up neglecting the energy of the music, the passionate tales of love and the group’s partiality for vocal harmonies."

AllMusic's Mark Deming praised "That's Not Me", "Here Today", and "Pet Sounds", but wrote: "more often, A Tribute to Pet Sounds sounds like the work of bands who may love the Beach Boys' original, but have no idea how to reconcile its magic with their own buzzy, narcotic outlook. ... Usually, even a mediocre tribute album will encourage new listeners to explore the original recordings, but the magic of Pet Sounds is so thoroughly absent here that it's hard to imagine who would turn to Brian Wilson's work by using this as a road map."

Track listing

See also
List of cover versions of Beach Boys songs

References

The Beach Boys tribute albums
2016 compilation albums
Alternative rock compilation albums
Compilation albums by American artists